The X-Men animated series debuted on October 31, 1992 on the Fox Network as part of the "Fox Kids" Saturday morning lineup. The plot was loosely adapted from famous storylines and events in the X-Men comics, such as the Dark Phoenix Saga, Days of Future Past, the Phalanx Covenant, and the Legacy Virus. The show features a team line-up similar to that of the early 1990s X-Men comic books: the lineup largely resembles that of Cyclops' Blue Team, established in the early issues of the second X-Men comic series. Cyclops, Wolverine, Rogue, Storm, Beast, Gambit, Jubilee, Jean Grey and Professor X were featured as the X-Men.

Synopsis
The series' first 13 episodes were notable for being possibly the first time that an animated series had a full season of episodes flow one into the next, creating a single continuing narrative, something the series producers fought heavily for. However, starting with season three, most episodes (except for multi-part stories) were shown in random order.

Each episode was assigned two different numbers internally. One was for script order, which indicates the number assigned by the production company. The other was for the production order, which are the official episode numbers assigned by Fox Children's Network, indicating the order in which they received the episodes. These both vary from the order in which the series actually aired after season three. According to series writer Steven Melching, the script order is the "best guide in terms of overall series continuity, as this is how the stories were originally envisioned to flow together."

The X-Men also appeared on Spider-Man in episodes "The Mutant Agenda" and "Mutants' Revenge". Storm later appeared in the three-part episode "Secret Wars"  on the good side against the evil side. The series was canceled after the episode "Graduation Day", which aired on September 20, 1997. The X-Men animated show was the longest-running Marvel Comics animated series, lasting for six years, with five seasons and a total of 76 episodes until their record was beaten by Ultimate Spider-Man, when its 77th episode aired on October 17, 2015.

The following list reflects the episode order as originally scripted. The television air-date order and DVD-release order disregard the script order.

Series overview

Episodes

Season 1 (1992–1993)

Season 2 (1993–1994) 
The second season saw a parallel narrative featuring Magneto and Professor X lost in the Savage Land interwoven throughout. Many of the stories dealt with the X-Men dealing with the professor's absence, as well as increasing the backstory of many of the X-Men, particularly Rogue and Wolverine.

Season 3 (1994–1995) 
After the five-part "Phoenix Saga", episodes were aired in a more random sequence. Also, due to animation problems with a few episodes, several did not air until the fourth or even fifth season.

Season 4 (1995–1996) 
Some of the Season 4 episodes were aired during Season 3 to compensate for episodes in that season being pushed back.

Season 5 (1996–1997) 
"Beyond Good and Evil" was meant to be an ending to the series, until Fox decided to buy more episodes at the last minute. As such, the final six episodes produced have a different animation style. To save money, Saban produced the final episodes of the series in house rather than involving Graz Entertainment, to whom it had outsourced production of the series until that point. Saban hired a studio in the Philippines (simply called the Philippine Animation Studio, which also worked on the second season of the 1994 Fantastic Four series) because the animation studio AKOM (the company that did the previous four seasons) was unavailable due to other projects in their pipeline.

Crossovers

Spider-Man (1994 TV series)

Footnotes 
 No Mutant Is an Island, A Deal with the Devil, and Longshot episodes were originally part of season three; however, due to animation problems they were held back for two years; and consequently, Jean Grey's resurrection was not properly explained.
 The Juggernaut Returns, Nightcrawler, and Weapon X, Lies, & Videotape episodes were originally a part of season four; however, they were pushed up to air during season three to make up for No Mutant Is an Island, A Deal with the Devil, and Longshot episodes being pushed back.

References 
Specific

General

 
 
 
 
 
 
 
 
 

X-Men episodes
X-Men
Lists of Canadian children's animated television series episodes
X-Men television series episodes
Episodes